Baryrhynchus miles is a species of beetle in the family Brentidae.

Description 
The body colour is dark reddish-brown and the elytra are dotted, wrinkled and adorned by small reddish areas.

Distribution 
This species occurs in Myanmar, northern Vietnam, the Himalayas, and western Bengal.

References 

 Universal Biological Indexer
 Annali del Museo

Brentidae
Beetles of Asia
Beetles described in 1845